J.W. Lees & Co (Brewers) Ltd is a brewery and pub company in Middleton, Greater Manchester, that has produced real ale since 1828.  The brewery owns and operates 150 pubs, inns and hotels mainly in North West England and North Wales. It also owns wine distributor Willoughby's.

History

The brewery was formed in 1828 when retired cotton manufacturer John Lees purchased land in Middleton, Lancashire and built Greengate Brewery, from which the company still operates.  The company was renamed J.W. Lees & Co. Brewers when his grandson, John William Lees, took over the company in 1876 and was re-incorporated in 1955 when R.W.T. Lees-Jones bought the share capital of the company back under single ownership.

The company is still family owned and operated. When William, Simon, Christina, Anna and Michael Lees-Jones joined Richard and Christopher at J.W. Lees in the 1990s, they were the sixth generation from the founder to work in the company.

In 2004, Greengate Brewery featured in the television show Most Haunted, and in 2003 HRH Charles, Prince of Wales visited to celebrate the brewery's 175th anniversary.

In 2011, J.W. Lees announced a new beer, The Governor, in collaboration with chef Marco Pierre White, and in 2018 The Governor Lager was added to the range. Also in 2018, the company announced a collaboration with physicist Brian Cox, an amber ale entitled Cosmic Brew. In 2018, the brewery converted the old boiler house on site into a microbrewery in order to create more experimental small barrelage productions.

In 2019, J.W. Lees won Best Brewing Pub company at the publican awards.

Beers

Draught

Bottled

In addition, J.W. Lees brews Ansells Mild and Carlsberg Lager.

Boilerhouse Microbrewery 
In 2018, the brewery converted their historic boiler house into a microbrewery. Overseen by head brewer Michael Lees-Jones, the boilerhouse allows small batch productions of more unusual and niche beers. Past productions have included a Vanilla White Stout, Chocolate Orange Mild and Strawberry Milkshake IPA.

Public Houses 

J.W. Lees has around 150 public houses, inns and hotels, primarily in residential areas in the North West of England and North Wales. The majority of these are run by tenant landlords, while roughly one third of the houses are managed by the brewery. The core of J.W. Lees' estate is situated in North Manchester and Oldham. This stems from the time of horse drawn dray wagons and how far they might travel in a day. The advent of motor travel allowed the brewery to acquire sites further afield, with the company gradually expanding its pub estate into wider Lancashire, Cheshire, North Wales and Yorkshire.  In 2009 J.W. Lees bought ten pubs from Punch Taverns and has continued to steadily grow its estate.

Inns and Hotels 
J.W. Lees operates a number of Inns and Hotels including The Alderley Edge Hotel, The Stanneylands Hotel and the Trearddur Bay Hotel.

Willoughby's Wine Merchants 
Willoughby's is the name of J.W. Lees' wines and spirits operation. Willoughby's has its own illustrious heritage stemming back to 1850 when it was founded by Frank Stanley Willoughby in Stockport.  Willoughby's has grown by acquisition of wine merchants including Thomas Batey and Sons, Duttons of Chester, Scatchards of Liverpool, Yates Brothers of Bolton and Lakeland Vintners in Bowness.  In 2012 Willoughby's ceased to operate any retail premises but continues to supply many licensed leisure venues through direct delivery.

References

External links
JW Lees Homepage

Companies based in Rochdale Borough
Breweries in England
British companies established in 1828
Middleton, Greater Manchester
Food and drink companies established in 1828
1828 establishments in England